Eucithara subterranea is a small sea snail, a marine gastropod mollusk in the family Mangeliidae.

Description

Distribution
The locality of the holotype is unknown.

References

 Röding, 1798, Mus. Bolten. p 52
 Cernohorsky, W. O. "A taxonomic evaluation of Recent and fossil non-mitrid species proposed in the family Mitridae (Mollusca: Gastropoda)." Records of the Auckland Institute and Museum (1972): 205-229.

External links
  Tucker, J.K. 2004 Catalog of recent and fossil turrids (Mollusca: Gastropoda). Zootaxa 682:1-1295.
 Worldwide Mollusc Species Data Base: Eucithara subterranea

subterranea
Gastropods described in 1798